The 1984 SANFL Grand Final was an Australian rules football competition. Norwood beat Port Adelaide beat by 100 to 91.

Norwood won their 26th SANFL premiership, their second under coach Neil Balme. The Redlegs created history by becoming the first team that finished fifth at the end of the home-and-away season to win the SANFL premiership.

The game
The match was played in front of a sell-out crowd in fine conditions.

Norwood Premiership Team

References

External links

SANFL Grand Finals
SANFL Grand Final, 1984